Peter Kendrew (born 25 April 1940) is a male English former competition swimmer.

Swimming career
He competed for Great Britain in the Olympics and European championships. Kendrew won a silver medal in the 4×100-metre freestyle relay at the 1962 European Aquatics Championships.  The British relay team of which he was a member finished seventh in the same event at the 1964 Summer Olympics in Tokyo.

He represented England and won a silver medal in the medley relay and two bronze medals in the freestyle relays at the 1958 British Empire and Commonwealth Games in Cardiff, Wales.

In the 2000s, he was still competing in the masters category.

See also
 List of Commonwealth Games medallists in swimming (men)

References

1940 births
Living people
Sportspeople from York
Swimmers at the 1964 Summer Olympics
Olympic swimmers of Great Britain
English male freestyle swimmers
European Aquatics Championships medalists in swimming
Swimmers at the 1962 British Empire and Commonwealth Games
Commonwealth Games medallists in swimming
Commonwealth Games silver medallists for England
Commonwealth Games bronze medallists for England
Medallists at the 1962 British Empire and Commonwealth Games